The 1987 Swedish Golf Tour was the second season of the Swedish Golf Tour, a series of professional golf tournaments for women held in Sweden.

Tournament Director for a second year was Ulf Jacobsson, and player representative was Liv Wollin. Tournaments were played over 54 holes with no cut, the SI and LET events over 72 holes with cuts.

Schedule
The season consisted of 9 events played between May and September. The tour planned to continue Kristianstad Ladies Open and Aspeboda Ladies Open as Ladies European Tour events and added the European Masters, slated to be the richest LET event of the season with a purse of 1,100,000, but ultimately withdrew all three from the LET.

Order of Merit

Source:

See also
1987 Swedish Golf Tour (men's tour)

References

External links
Official homepage of the Swedish Golf Tour

Swedish Golf Tour (women)
Swedish Golf Tour (women)